Christopher Fowler (born 1850, date of death unknown) was a United States Navy sailor and a recipient of the United States military's highest decoration, the Medal of Honor.

Biography
Born in New York in 1850, Fowler joined the Navy from that state. On that day, while Fortune  was off the coast of Punta Zapotitlán, Veracruz, Mexico, one of the ship's small boats was sent towards shore. A strong gale arose and the boat was capsized by the rough surf; four of the crew drowned but at least two were rescued. For his "gallant conduct" during the incident, Fowler was awarded the Medal of Honor.

Fowler's official Medal of Honor citation reads:
Served on board the U.S.S. Fortune off Point Zapotitlan, Mexico, 11 May 1874. On the occasion of the capsizing of one of the boats of the Fortune and the drowning of a portion of the boat's crew, Fowler displayed gallant conduct.

See also

List of Medal of Honor recipients during peacetime

References

External links

1850 births
Year of death missing
Military personnel from New York City
United States Navy sailors
United States Navy Medal of Honor recipients
Non-combat recipients of the Medal of Honor